Visori is a village in the municipalities of Lopare (Republika Srpska) and Čelić, Tuzla Canton, Bosnia and Herzegovina.

Demographics 
According to the 2013 census, its population was 2, both Serbs living in the Čelić part, thus none in Lopare.

References

Populated places in Lopare
Populated places in Čelić